The Friedensfeld Midlands Moravian Church and Manse are historic buildings in Christiansted, Saint Croix, Virgin Islands.

The present church building was built in 1854, replacing a structure that had been dedicated on February 12, 1819.  The  property, with its two contributing buildings, was added to the National Register of Historic Places on July 1, 1976.  It has an associated cemetery.

The church may have been prefabricated in Germany and assembled by German craftsmen plus local builders.

It was built in c.1810.

References

National Register of Historic Places in the United States Virgin Islands
Churches completed in 1854
Neoclassical architecture in the United States
Gothic Revival architecture in the United States Virgin Islands
Properties of religious function on the National Register of Historic Places in the United States Virgin Islands
Saint Croix, U.S. Virgin Islands
Moravian churches in the United States Virgin Islands
History of the Eastern West Indies Province of the Moravian Church
1819 establishments in the Danish colonial empire